, sometimes referred to as , is a series of five tactical role-playing and real-time strategy video games developed by Quest Corporation and is currently owned by Square Enix through Square's acquisition of Quest. There are five original games in the series, one of which has received a remake and a subsequent remaster.

Overview
The first video game in the series, Ogre Battle: The March of the Black Queen, was released in 1993 for the Super Nintendo Entertainment System in Japan, and two years later in North America. The title was a real-time strategy role playing game, set in a medieval fantasy world. The second game in the series, Tactics Ogre: Let Us Cling Together, was released in 1995 in Japan. It was a turn-based tactical role-playing game making use of isometric graphics, and the title is largely considered to be "exceptionally influential" to the genre. Two subsequent games in the Ogre Battle series – Ogre Battle 64: Person of Lordly Caliber and Ogre Battle Gaiden: Prince of Zenobia – follow the real-time strategy gameplay of the original title in the franchise, while Tactics Ogre: The Knight of Lodis follows the turn-based tactical role-playing gameplay elements of the second game in the series.

The Knight of Lodis, released in 2001, is the last original release in the franchise. In 2010, Tactics Ogre: Let Us Cling Together was remade for the PlayStation Portable as Tactics Ogre: Wheel of Fortune, but the characters, story and setting are identical to the 1995 release. The creator of the series, Yasumi Matsuno, directed the remake of the game. Matsuno was also responsible for another highly influential title, Final Fantasy Tactics, originally released in 1997. Though the title bears no relation to the Ogre Battle series, Final Fantasy Tactics is considered by some critics to be a spiritual successor to Tactics Ogre. As of 2016, the franchise mostly remains active through re-releases of the first two games for the Nintendo's Virtual Console service in Japan, North America and Europe.

Both "Ogre Battle" and "The March of the Black Queen" were titles to Queen songs from their 1974 album Queen II. In addition, "Let Us Cling Together" is the subtitle to their song "Teo Torriatte (Let Us Cling Together)" from 1976's A Day at the Races.

Video games

Main series

Side stories

Related software
A prerelease demo of Tactics Ogre: Let Us Cling Together was made available in early October 1995 for the Super Famicom add-on Satellaview. It consists of a battle in a preset map where the player has full control over two opposing teams, similar to the training mode in the full version of game.

In 1996, Bothtec Corporation released in Japan a CD-ROM containing a collection of images and artwork used in Tactics Ogre: Let Us Cling Together. The package is titled Tactics Ogre Complete Works and also includes icons, wallpapers, databases and a screen saver. It is available for Windows 95 and Mac OS.

Reception

Sales
The series has sold over 2 million copies worldwide, placing it among the best-selling Japanese role-playing game franchises.

Critical reception
Among critics, the series was acclaimed both in Japan and North America. According to the review aggregator GameRankings, the SNES release of March of the Black Queen has an average aggregate rating of 84%, while the PlayStation port of Let Us Cling Together has an average of 81%. Ogre Battle 64 has an average of 86% and The Knight of Lodis 84%. In Japan, gaming magazine Weekly Famitsu scored the Super Famicom releases of March of the Black Queen and Let Us Cling Together 33/40 and 34/40, respectively. The magazine also provided high scores for Ogre Battle 64 (33/40) and The Knight of Lodis (34/40), while Prince of Zenobia received a slightly lower score, 28/40. The PSP remake of Let Us Cling Together is the most critically acclaimed release in the series, with an average of 88% at GameRankings and a score of 36/40 from Weekly Famitsu.

See also
 List of Square Enix video game franchises
 Final Fantasy Tactics

References

 
Square Enix franchises
Video game franchises introduced in 1993
Video game franchises
Video games developed in Japan
Japanese brands
Tactical role-playing video games by series